Coelotanypus scapularis is a species of midge in the family Chironomidae. Larvae are aquatic, feeding on diatoms, crustaceans, oligochaetes, and other insects.

References

Further reading

External links

 

Tanypodinae
Articles created by Qbugbot
Insects described in 1866
Diptera of North America